Sekul Islam (1949 – 21 July 2021) was a Bangladeshi educationist. He was a Professor in the Department of Electrical and Electronic Engineering at University of Dhaka and former Vice Chancellor of Atish Dipankar University of Science and Technology.

Early life 
Born in 1949, Sekul Islam was native of the village of West Baishpur in Matlab South Upazila of Chandpur District, Bangladesh.

Education 
Sekul Islam was a student of Department of Applied Physics, Electronics and Communication Engineering. He holds a master's degree from Dhaka University. He received his PhD in 1994 from Vienna University of Technology.

Career 
Sekul Islam joined Dhaka University in 1974 as a Lecturer. In addition to being Assistant Professor, Associate Professor and Selection Grade Professor in the Department, he participated on behalf of the blue team in the 2012 DU Syndicate election. Since retiring from Dhaka University in 2016, he has been teaching at ADUST.

During his career he held various important positions including Director of Energy Institute of Dhaka University, Dean of Faculty of Engineering and Technology, Head of Department, Member of Professors Recruitment Board of several Universities, Member of Syndicate and Academic Council.

Sekul Islam joined ADUST on 1 August 2017 as the Vice Chancellor.

Research work and publications 
He has published a significant number of research articles in national and international journals. He is also the author of three textbooks.

Death 
Sekul Islam died on 21 July 2021 at BSMMU in Dhaka due to cardiac arrest.

References 

1949 births
2021 deaths
People from Chandpur District
University of Dhaka alumni
TU Wien alumni
Bangladeshi educators
Vice-Chancellors of Atish Dipankar University of Science and Technology